Muisca bitaeniata is the accepted type species of checkered beetles of the genus Muisca in the subfamily of Clerinae or Enopliinae. It was first described by entomologist Maximilian Spinola in 1844.

Etymology 
The genus Muisca has been named after the Muisca from the Altiplano Cundiboyacense in central Colombia. Bitaeniata means "two-striped".

Description 
The description of the beetle is made in French and Spinola used for measuring the body parts of the sole specimen, which he thinks was a male, the old French unit of length ligne.

The labium and maxilla of the genus Muisca are less wide than long. This differs from the genus Aulicus.

Antennas, body and legs are red. Eyes and extremities of the mandibles are black. Two black stripes over each elytra (forewing).

 body length - 3 1/2 ligne ~ 
 head - 1/2 ligne wide ~

See also 

 List of flora and fauna named after the Muisca

References 

Cleridae
Beetles of South America
Endemic fauna of Colombia
Arthropods of Colombia
Altiplano Cundiboyacense
Muysccubun
Beetles described in 1844